Paul Sauvanet, born in 1950, is a French musician, pianist, composer, conductor and music professor.

Discography 
La détente par la musique  (1988) Les Voiles d'Or
Sérénité   (1989) Les Voiles d'Or
La cérémonie de l'oiseau  (1989) Les Voiles d'Or
La respiration consciente  (1990) Les Voiles d'Or
Migrations  (1990) Les Voiles d'Or
Le songe du temps  (1991) Les Voiles d'Or
Eleusis  (1992) Les Voiles d'Or  (1994) Polygram
Time Dreaming  (1994) Polygram 
Tristesse  (1995) Hearts of Space Records
Nomad  (1997) Hearts of Space

References
Sauvanet at Allmusic.com

French composers
French male composers
1950 births
Living people